Flamborough may refer to:

 Flamborough, East Riding, Yorkshire, England, UK
 Flamborough, Ontario, Canada
 HMS Flamborough, a British Royal Navy ship name
 Empire Flamborough, the Empire ship Flamborough
 Ancaster—Dundas—Flamborough—Westdale, a Canadian federal electoral district in Ontario
 Flamborough—Glanbrook, a planned Canadian federal electoral district in Ontario
 Ancaster—Dundas—Flamborough—Aldershot, a former Canadian federal electoral district in Ontario
 Ancaster—Dundas—Flamborough—Westdale (provincial electoral district), a Canadian provincial electoral district of Ontario
 Ancaster—Dundas—Flamborough—Aldershot (provincial electoral district), a former Canadian provincial electoral district of Ontario
 Flamborough railway station, a former rail station in Marton, Yorkshire, England, UK

See also
 Flamborough Head (disambiguation)
 HMS Flamborough Prize (1757), the former General Lally